Järvakandi is a borough in central Estonia. Administratively it constituted Järvakandi Parish until 2017 — a rural municipality within Rapla County. After the 2017 reforms of municipalities, it is now located in Kehtna Parish. The municipality had a population of 1,375 as of January 2012 and an area of 4.83 km².

The rock music festival Rabarock was held in Järvakandi from 2005 to 2012.

Gallery

References

External links
Official website 
Järvakandi Gymnasium 
Järvakandi glass museum 
Rabarock music festival 
Club Cinema Nightclub

Municipalities of Estonia
Boroughs and small boroughs in Estonia
Kehtna Parish
Kreis Harrien